Veronika Kozelska Fenclová (born 21 January 1981 in Prague) is a Czech sailor. She competed in the Laser Radial class event at the 2012 Summer Olympics, where she placed ninth.

References

1981 births
Living people
Czech female sailors (sport)
Olympic sailors of the Czech Republic
Sailors at the 2012 Summer Olympics – Laser Radial
Sportspeople from Prague
Sailors at the 2016 Summer Olympics – Laser Radial